United Nations Security Council Resolution 149, adopted unanimously on August 23, 1960, after examining the application of the Republic of Upper Volta (now Burkina Faso) for membership in the United Nations, the Council recommended to the General Assembly that the Republic of Upper Volta be admitted.

See also
List of United Nations Security Council Resolutions 101 to 200 (1953–1965)

References
Text of the Resolution at undocs.org

External links
 

 0149
Political history of Burkina Faso
Foreign relations of Burkina Faso
 0149
1960 in Upper Volta
 0149
August 1960 events

ckb:بڕیارنامەی ١٥٠ی ئەنجومەنی ئاسایش